Caughnawaga Indian Village Site (also known as the Veeder site) is an archaeological site located just west of Fonda in Montgomery County, New York. It is the location of a 17th-century Mohawk nation village. One of the original Five Nations of the Iroquois League, or Haudenosaunee, the Mohawk lived west of Albany and occupied much of the Mohawk Valley. Other Iroquois nations were located west of them and south of the Great Lakes. 

The Mohawk had trading relationships with French colonists coming south from Quebec, with Dutch based in Albany, and with the later English who took over Dutch territory. Under pressure from the French in the late 17th century, some Mohawk moved to other areas. Some who had converted to Catholicism relocated to mission villages near Montreal and to the west along the St. Lawrence River. 

Because most of the Mohawk in the New York and Pennsylvania areas were allied with Great Britain during the American Revolutionary War, they were mostly forced out of New York when Britain ceded its territory in the colonies to the new United States. The Crown provided some land in compensation at what became the Six Nations Reserve of the Grand River, Ontario.  

This former village site was discovered in 1950 by Rev. Thomas Grassmann. It is the only Mohawk village site in the country to have been completely excavated for archeological studies.

Description
The Mohawk village site has been marked with stakes to show the outlines of the 12 longhouses and stockade that existed there 300 years ago. The entire site is open to the public. People may walk around the former village and see the foundations of the Caughnawaga longhouses and the layout. The site is on a hill. The archeological site was listed on the National Register of Historic Places in 1973.

Nearby are the Mohawk-Caughnawaga museum and the National Shrine of Blessed Kateri Tekakwitha, who was canonized in the 20th century as the first Native American saint in the Roman Catholic Church.

The name Caughnawaga is derived from the Mohawk word kahnawà:ke, meaning "place of the rapids", referring to the nearby rapids of the Mohawk River.

The site is also known as Indian Castle, or Gandaouage; or Kachnawage in Mohawk, meaning "castle" or "fortified place." This village with its defensive palisade was the Native American form of a castle. The site is on the north side of the Mohawk River and is also close to a natural spring.

History
Caughnawaga was occupied by the Mohawk from at least 1666 to 1693. French Jesuits established a mission there, which operated for about 10 years ranging from 1668 to 1679. They taught some of the Mohawk to read and write in French, as well as teaching them about Christianity. Historians now believe that the village known as "Caughnawaga" was located upstream at the "Fox Farm site" until 1679, at which time it moved to this location. 

Archeologist Dean Snow estimates the village had a population of around 300 people. This was fewer than had lived at the Fox Farm site. By 1679 some Catholic Mohawk had migrated to a mission village, Kahnawake, south of Montreal along the St. Lawrence River. That village is now one of several Mohawk reserves in Canada.

The Caughnawaga site in New York is now a center for recreation and culture.

Gallery

See also
 Caughnawaga, New York

References

External links

The National Shrine of Blessed Kateri Tekakwitha

Archaeological sites on the National Register of Historic Places in New York (state)
Iroquois populated places
Former Native American populated places in the United States
Mohawk tribe
Native American history of New York (state)
Buildings and structures in Montgomery County, New York
Tourist attractions in Montgomery County, New York
National Register of Historic Places in Montgomery County, New York